Richard Erdman ( John Richard Erdmann; June 1, 1925 – March 16, 2019) was an American character actor and occasional film and television director. He appeared in more than 160 films and television productions between 1944 and 2017, mostly in supporting roles. He is most known for his roles in the classic films Stalag 17 (1953) and Tora! Tora! Tora! (1970). In his final years, Erdman found renewed fame through his portrayal of Leonard in the critically acclaimed comedy series Community (2009–2015).

Early life 
Erdman was born John Richard Erdmann in Enid, Oklahoma. His parents divorced during his childhood. He, a sibling, and their mother moved to Colorado Springs when he was a teenager. He graduated from Palmer High School, where he would perform on stage. 

During his youth, he worked as a paper boy for the Colorado Springs Evening Telegraph. A stage director named Newton Winburne encouraged him to try his luck in Hollywood.

Career 
Erdman started his career at Warner Bros. where he signed a studio contract. Two of his first roles were in the films Mr. Skeffington, starring Bette Davis and Claude Rains and Janie, starring Joyce Reynolds. After a few smaller roles he achieved success as a character actor in supporting roles. In a career that spanned seven decades, his best-known roles are that of the barracks chief Hoffy in Stalag 17, and the garrulous, tedious barfly McNulty in the Twilight Zone episode "A Kind of a Stopwatch". He also appeared in The Men (1950) with Marlon Brando and the film noir Cry Danger (1951) with Dick Powell and Rhonda Fleming. In Tora! Tora! Tora! (1970) he played Colonel Edward F. French, the officer who responded to the failure to transmit the warning to Pearl Harbor, Hawaii. In the CBS TV series Perry Mason he played as murder victim Arthur Binney in the 1958 episode "The Case of the Gilded Lily". He later played the role of murderer three times: in "The Case of the Absent Artist" (1962), "The Case of the Antic Angel" (1964), and "The Case of the Vanishing Victim" (1966).

He guest starred in a wide variety of shows such as Alfred Hitchcock Presents; The Dick Van Dyke Show;  The Man from U.N.C.L.E.; I Dream of Jeannie; The Beverly Hillbillies; Here's Lucy; That Girl; The Six Million Dollar Man; The Bionic Woman; One Day at a Time; Lou Grant; Quincy, M.E.; Cheers; and Murder, She Wrote.

He was also known as a voice artist, contributing to the animated shows, Scooby-Doo and Scrappy-Doo, The Amazing Spider-Man, Jonny Quest, DuckTales, Snorks, Paddington, and Batman: The Animated Series.

He directed the 1971 TV film Mooch Goes to Hollywood. From 2009 to 2015, Erdman had a recurring role as the antagonistic and elderly community college student Leonard on Community. His last role was in 2017 in the sitcom Dr. Ken.

Personal life
Erdman married actress Leza Holland in 1948, but they divorced two years later. He was married to his second wife, Sharon Randall, from 1953 until her death in 2016. They had one daughter, Erica, who was born in 1954 and died on February 18, 2010, of an accidental overdose of prescription medicine. Erica was a poet and illustrator (The Ellyn Maybe Coloring Book) and the author of one full-length collection of poems (The Apocalyptic Kid).

Death 
Erdman died on March 16, 2019, aged 93, in an assisted-living facility in Los Angeles, California. He had been suffering "from age-related dementia" and had recently had a fall.

Filmography

Film

Television

As a director

References

External links

1925 births
2019 deaths
20th-century American male actors
21st-century American male actors
Actors from Enid, Oklahoma
American male film actors
American male television actors
American male voice actors
American people of German descent
Audiobook narrators
Film directors from Oklahoma
Male actors from Oklahoma